The Tajikistan women's national football team (
The Tajikistan women's national football team represents Tajikistan in international women's association football. It is fielded by the Tajikistan Football Federation (FFT), the governing body of football in Tajikistan, and competes as a member of the Asian Football Confederation.

The team played its first FIFA-sanctioned official international match on 3 April 2017 against the Iraq.

List of players

Note: Players are listed by the number of caps, then the number of goals scored. Players are listed alphabetically if the number of goals is equal.

This list features FIFA-sanctioned matches only (excluding 2018 Asian Games Matches against China, North Korea and Kong Kong).

See also 
 Tajikistan women's national football team
 :Category:Tajikistani women's footballers
 Tajikistan women's national football team#Current squad

References

External links 
 Tajikistan - Team Info

 
Tajikistan
Association football player non-biographical articles